The Minden Aqueduct is an aqueduct near Minden, North Rhine-Westphalia, Germany. It actually consists of two parallel water bridges, that lead the Mittelland Canal over the Weser. The older of the two bridges is no longer used for shipping. After the Magdeburg Water Bridge, it is the second biggest aqueduct in Europe.

The aqueduct is part of an intersection of waterways: the Mittelland Canal is connected with the Weser by two branch, or link, canals.

Canal bridge

Old bridge 

The first canal bridge over the river Weser was built in 1914. It is a 370-metre-long concrete construction. At the end of World War II it was destroyed by the retreating Wehrmacht in 1945. In 1949, the renovated bridge was re-opened.

New bridge 

Over the years, ships became larger and so the canal grew too small. Thus in 1993, work began on a new bridge. This new bridge was made of steel and opened in 1998.

Northern Link Canal 
The Northern Link Canal of the Minden Aqueduct is west of the canal bridge and the shortest connection between Mittelland Canal and Weser. It is 1.2 km long and enables an approach to the Abstiegshafen.

Schacht Lock (Schachtschleuse)

Weser Lock

Southern Link Canal 
The Southern Link Canal on the right bank of the Weser has two locks and also connects the Mittelland Canal to the River Weser. Between the two locks is the industrial port of Minden and the entrance of the old Weser port with its disused Weser shipyard.

Upper lock

Lower lock

Industrial harbour

Pumping stations

Main pumping station

Auxiliary pumping station

Information Centre

Leo-Sympher-Memorial

External links 

Bauwerke im Zuständigkeitsbereich des Wasser- und Schifffahrtsamtes Minden
Luftbild des Wassserstrassenkreuzes in Minden, und weiterführende Informationen 

Navigable aqueducts in Germany
Buildings and structures in Minden-Lübbecke
Aqueduct
Federal waterways in Germany
Bridges completed in 1914
Bridges completed in 1998